Globba albiflora is a small plant in the ginger family, Zingiberaceae, sometimes called dancing ladies. This species can be found in Indo-China, Peninsular Malaysia and Sumatra; in Viet Nam the genus may likewise be called gừng vũ nữ or lô ba.

Varieties
Varieties include:
 G. albiflora var. aurea Holttum
 G. albiflora var. albiflora

References

Zingiberoideae
Flora of Indo-China
Flora of Malesia